Oncomeris is a genus of true bugs belonging to the family Tessaratomidae.

Species
 Oncomeris bernsteini Vollenhoven 1872
 Oncomeris flavicornis (Guérin-Méneville, 1831
 Oncomeris ostraciopterus (Montrouzier, 1855)
 Oncomeris robustus (Lep. & Serv.)

Distribution
These bugs are present in Australia, Lesser Sunda Islands, Moluccas, New Guinea and Sulawesi.

References

Tessaratomidae
Pentatomomorpha genera
Hemiptera of Oceania